The II Constitutional Government was the second Constitutional Government (administration or cabinet) under the Constitution of East Timor.  Formed on 10 July 2006, it was led by the country's third Prime Minister, José Ramos-Horta, and was replaced by the III Constitutional Government on 19 May 2007.

Composition
The government was made up of Ministers, Vice Ministers and Secretaries of State, as follows:

Ministers

Vice Ministers

Secretaries of State

References

Cabinets established in 2006
Cabinets disestablished in 2007
Constitutional Governments of East Timor
2006 establishments in East Timor
2007 disestablishments in East Timor